Omar al-Haddouchi is a Moroccan Islamic scholar who is among the leaders of the Salafi movement in Morocco.

Education

History

He said during his trial, "We are preachers, not revolutionaries. It is not our job to judge others, which is a prerogative of the Sultan and his delegates". At the same time, he has also been described as "the most hard-line Salafist" in this trend and is known as a supporter of al-Qaeda.

2011 pardon

Al-Haddouchi was sentenced to thirty years in prison because of his connections to the perpetrators of 2003 Casablanca bombings, but was released from prison in 2011 after the Moroccan King Mohammed VI gave him a pardon in an Arab Spring initiative.

2012

On Apr 15, 2012 he called for all Muslims living in France to leave and return to North Africa.

On October 21, 2012, a leader of Ansar al-Sharia Morocco, Hassan Younsi, was arrested after leaving the home of Omar al-Haddouchi.

References

Living people
Moroccan Salafis
Prisoners and detainees of Morocco
People imprisoned on charges of terrorism
Recipients of Moroccan royal pardons
Bibliographers
Moroccan biographers
Salafi jihadists
Year of birth missing (living people)